Markovskaya is a rural locality (a village) in Ramenskoye Rural Settlement, Syamzhensky District, Vologda Oblast, Russia. The population was 16 as of 2002.

Geography 
Markovskaya is located 49 km north of Syamzha (the district's administrative centre) by road. Mininskaya is the nearest rural locality.

References 

Rural localities in Syamzhensky District